The qualification round of  Men's 50 metre pistol event started on the morning of 28 July 2014 at the Barry Buddon Shooting Centre, while the final was held in the evening at the same place. The qualification round was topped by Indian Shooter Jitu Rai, which was also a Commonwealth Games Record.

Results

Qualification

Final

References

External links
Schedule

Shooting at the 2014 Commonwealth Games